Soncino (locally ) is a comune (municipality) in the Province of Cremona in the Italian region Lombardy, located about  east of Milan and about  northwest of Cremona.

Soncino borders the following municipalities: Casaletto di Sopra, Cumignano sul Naviglio, Fontanella, Genivolta, Orzinuovi, Roccafranca, Ticengo, Torre Pallavicina, Villachiara. It is located on the banks of the river Oglio.

Soncino received the honorary title of city with a presidential decree on November 18, 2004.

Main sights

The well-preserved Castle (Rocca Sforzesca), built in 1473 for Galeazzo Maria Sforza. It has three square towers and a round one. It has been chosen as set for movies like Ladyhawke and Il mestiere delle armi.
The church of San Giacomo and the annexed former Dominican convent, with an octagonal pending tower.
The church of Santa Maria Assunta (12th century).
The Town Hall with the Civic Tower.
The Casa degli Stampatori ("Printers' House"), where, in 1488, the first complete Jewish Bible in the world was printed. See the entry for: Soncino family (printers)
The Renaissance Santa Maria delle Grazie, with a fine interior.

References

External links
 Official website
 Soncino Turismo (tourism promotion)
 Pro Loco di Soncino (tourism promotion)
 Castrum Soncini (tourism promotion)
 

Cities and towns in Lombardy
Castles in Italy